Thedwastre can refer to:

 "Theodward's tree", a supposed historic tree in Thurston, Suffolk
 Thedwastre Hundred, a defunct hundred of the ceremonial county of Suffolk, named for the tree
 Thedwastre Rural District, a defunct rural district in the administrative county of West Suffolk, named after the hundred